The 1984 United States House of Representatives elections in South Carolina were held on November 6, 1984 to select six Representatives for two-year terms from the state of South Carolina.  The primary elections for the Democrats and the Republicans were held on June 12.  All six incumbents were re-elected and the composition of the state delegation remained three Democrats and three Republicans.

1st congressional district
Incumbent Republican Congressman Thomas F. Hartnett of the 1st congressional district, in office since 1981, defeated Democratic challenger Ed Pendarvis.

General election results

|-
| 
| colspan=5 |Republican hold
|-

2nd congressional district
Incumbent Republican Congressman Floyd Spence of the 2nd congressional district, in office since 1971, defeated Democratic challenger Ken Mosely.

Democratic primary

General election results

|-
| 
| colspan=5 |Republican hold
|-

3rd congressional district
Incumbent Democratic Congressman Butler Derrick of the 3rd congressional district, in office since 1975, defeated Republican challenger Clarence E. Taylor.

Republican primary

General election results

|-
| 
| colspan=5 |Democratic hold
|-

4th congressional district
Incumbent Republican Congressman Carroll Campbell of the 4th congressional district, in office since 1979, defeated Democratic challenger Jeff Smith.

General election results

|-
| 
| colspan=5 |Republican hold
|-

5th congressional district
Incumbent Democratic Congressman John M. Spratt, Jr. of the 5th congressional district, in office since 1983, defeated two minor party candidates.

General election results

|-
| 
| colspan=5 |Democratic hold
|-

6th congressional district
Incumbent Democratic Congressman Robin Tallon of the 6th congressional district, in office since 1983, won the Democratic primary and defeated Republican Martha Lois Eargle in the general election.

Democratic primary

Republican primary

General election results

|-
| 
| colspan=5 |Democratic hold
|-

See also
United States House elections, 1984
United States Senate election in South Carolina, 1984
South Carolina's congressional districts

References

1984
United States House of Representatives
South Carolina